Vinay Rajkumar (born 7 May 1989) is an Indian actor who works in Kannada cinema. The grandson of actor Rajkumar and son of film producer and former actor Raghavendra, he made his debut as a lead actor in 2014 with Siddhartha.

Early life
Vinay Rajkumar was born to actor and film producer Raghavendra Rajkumar and Mangala. He is the grandson of actor Rajkumar. He has a younger brother, Yuva Rajkumar. The actors Shiva and Puneeth are his paternal uncles. Vinay earned a bachelor's degree in commerce from St. Joseph's College of Commerce, Bangalore.

Vinay's grandfather, Rajkumar first brought him on-screen at the age of four in the film Aakasmika (1993). Vinay followed this with appearances in Odahuttidavaru (1994), his father's film's Anuragada Alegalu (1993) and Navibbaru Namagibbaru (1993), and uncle Shiva's Om (1995) and Hrudaya Hrudaya (1999).

Vinay studied and trained as an actor in "acting workshops with a couple of people" before "training... in theatre". He subsequently trained in dance and martial arts from trainers of his uncles' films. In an interview with The Times of India in 2012, he said he was "involved with the filming of [uncle Puneeth's film] Yaare Koogadali", having already worked in the filming of the latter's previous film Anna Bond (2012).

Filmography

Awards
South Indian International Movie Awards
 2016: Best Debut Actor – Siddhartha

References

External links
 

Living people
Male actors in Kannada cinema
Indian male film actors
Male actors from Bangalore
21st-century Indian male actors
20th-century Indian male actors
South Indian International Movie Awards winners
1989 births
Rajkumar family